John Morin "Jack" Bradbury (December 27, 1914 - May 15, 2004) was an American animator and comic book artist. Bradbury began working for Disney at age 20 and was responsible for key scenes in films like Pinocchio, Fantasia and Bambi.  After working briefly for Friz Freleng at Warner Bros., he began working for Western Publishing in 1947, illustrating Little Golden Books, other children's books, and comic books for the Dell Comics  and Gold Key Comics imprints along with the Disney Studio Program.  Reportedly, Walt Disney told Western that they didn't need his approval for any of Bradbury's work. Also, Bob Clampett specifically requested Bradbury to illustrate the comic book adaptation of his show Time for Beany.

Career
According to the book Walt's People - Volume 3: Talking Disney with the Artists who Knew Him by Didier Ghez, which presents a full reprint of an interview with Jack conducted by Klaus Strzyz in 1978, he never considered himself a "very good duck man", preferring to draw stories with Mickey and Goofy. When Mr. Strzyz asked him about the quality of 1940s, 1950s and 1960s Disney comic stories in comparison with the 1970s ones, he answered that the then later ones were far better in terms of quality, the only exception being Barks' old ones. He also affirmed that he felt embarrassed when he saw some of his own early works.

Although he didn't have a very good opinion about his own work with Donald and his family, Bradbury drew important and popular stories with them, like "Family Tree". And some of those ones presented noteworthy one-off characters as well, such as Blarney O'Duck (a cunning and obstinate sea captain), Cousin Daniel Duck (an old sheriff with rheumatism), Dick Duck (a self-important and terribly frank private detective), Myron O'Duck (a scoundrel who almost married Grandma Duck), and Aunt Myrtle (an absurdly strong but nice aunt of Daisy).

Eye problems forced Bradbury to cut back on his output after 1970, though he still continued to work on a few projects for Disney.

He died in 2004 from kidney failure.

Filmography

References

External links

Jack Bradbury at the Lambiek Comiclopedia

Comic Art of Jack Bradbury
Forgotten Disney Legends: Jack Bradbury
Excerpts from Jack Bradbury's Autobiography

Animators from Washington (state)
1914 births
2004 deaths
Deaths from kidney failure
Little Golden Books
American comics artists
Disney comics artists
Walt Disney Animation Studios people
Warner Bros. Cartoons people